Gerahty is a surname. Notable people with the surname include:

 Cecil Gerahty (1888–1938), English journalist
 Charles Cyril Gerahty (1888–1978), British colonial judge 
 Digby George Gerahty (1898–1981), English novelist
 Peter Gerahty (1921–2013), British Army officer

See also
 Geraghty